The destroyers-for-bases deal was an agreement between the United States and the United Kingdom on September 2, 1940, according to which 50 , , and  US Navy destroyers were transferred to the Royal Navy from the US Navy in exchange for land rights on British possessions.

Generally referred to as the "twelve hundred-ton type" (also known as "flush-deck", or "four-pipers" after their four funnels), the destroyers became the British  and were named after towns common to both countries. US President Franklin Roosevelt used an executive agreement, which does not require congressional approval. However, he came under heavy attack from antiwar Americans, who pointed out that the agreement violated the Neutrality Acts.

Background 
By late June 1940, France had surrendered to Germany and Italy. The British and their Commonwealth and empire stood alone in warfare against Hitler and Mussolini.

The British Chiefs of Staff Committee concluded in May that if France collapsed, "we do not think we could continue the war with any chance of success" without "full economic and financial support" from the United States. The US government was sympathetic to Britain's plight, but US public opinion then overwhelmingly supported isolationism to avoid involvement in "another European war". Reflecting on that sentiment, the US Congress had passed the Neutrality Acts three years earlier, which banned the shipment or sale of arms from the US to any combatant nation. US President Franklin D. Roosevelt was further constrained by the upcoming 1940 Presidential election, as his critics sought to portray him as being pro-war.  Legal advice from the US Justice Department stated that the transaction was legal.

By late May, the evacuation of British forces from Dunkirk, France, in Operation Dynamo caused the Royal Navy to need ships immediately, especially as it now fought the Battle of the Atlantic in which German U-boats threatened the British supplies of food and of other resources essential to the war effort.

With German troops advancing rapidly into France and many in the US government convinced that the defeat of France and Britain was imminent, the US sent a proposal to London through the British ambassador, the Marquess of Lothian, for an American lease of airfields on Trinidad, Bermuda and Newfoundland.

British Prime Minister Winston Churchill initially rejected the offer on May 27 unless Britain received something immediate in return. On June 1, as the defeat of France loomed, Roosevelt bypassed the Neutrality Act by declaring as "surplus" many millions of rounds of US ammunition and obsolescent small arms and authorizing their shipment to Britain. Roosevelt rejected Churchill's pleas for destroyers for the Royal Navy.

By August, while Britain was reaching a low point, US Ambassador Joseph P. Kennedy reported from London that a British surrender was "inevitable". Seeking to persuade Roosevelt to send the destroyers, Churchill warned Roosevelt ominously that if Britain were vanquished, its colonial islands close to American shores could become a direct threat to the US if they fell into German hands.

Deal 
Roosevelt approved the deal on the evening of August 30, 1940. On September 2, 1940, as the Battle of Britain intensified, Secretary of State Cordell Hull signaled agreement to the transfer of the warships to the Royal Navy. On September 3, 1940, Admiral Harold Stark certified that the destroyers were not vital to US security. In exchange, the US was granted land in various British possessions for the establishment of naval or air bases with rent-free 99-year leases, on:

 Newfoundland 
 Eastern side of the Bahamas
 Southern coast of Jamaica
 Western coast of Saint Lucia
 West coast of Trinidad (Gulf of Paria)
 Antigua
 British Guiana (now Guyana) within fifty miles of Georgetown

The agreement also granted the US air and naval base rights in:

 The Great Sound and Castle Harbour, Bermuda
 South and eastern coasts of Newfoundland

No destroyers were received in exchange for the bases in Bermuda and Newfoundland. Both territories were vital to trans-Atlantic shipping, aviation, and the Battle of the Atlantic. Although enemy attack on either territory was unlikely, it could not be discounted, and Britain had been forced wastefully to maintain defensive forces, including the Bermuda Garrison. The deal allowed Britain to hand much of the defence of Bermuda to the still-neutral US, which freed British forces for redeployment to more active theatres and enabled the development of strategic facilities at US expense, which British forces would also use.

Both the Royal Air Force (RAF) and the Fleet Air Arm (FAA) maintained air stations in Bermuda at the start of the war, but they served only flying boats. The RAF station on Darrell's Island served as a staging point for trans-Atlantic flights by RAF Transport Command and RAF Ferry Command, BOAC, and Pan-Am and hosted the Bermuda Flying School, but it did not operate maritime patrols. The FAA station on Boaz Island serviced aircraft based on vessels operating from or through the Royal Naval Dockyard, but it attempted to maintain maritime patrols by using pilots from naval ships, RAF Darrell's Island, and the Bermuda Flying School.

The agreement for bases in Bermuda stipulated that the US would, at its own expense, build an airfield capable of handling large landplanes that would be operated jointly by the US Army Air Force and the Royal Air Force. The airfield was named Kindley Field after Field Kindley, an American aviator who fought for Britain during World War I. RAF Transport Command relocated its operations to the airfield when it was completed in 1943, but RAF Ferry Command remained at Darrell's Island. The US Navy had established the Naval Operating Base at Bermuda's West End, a flying boat station from which maritime patrols were operated for the remainder of the war (the US Navy had actually begun operating such patrols from RAF Darrell's Island by using floatplanes and was waiting for their own base to become operational). The RAF and FAA facilities were closed after the war, which left only the US air bases in Bermuda. The Naval Operating Base ceased to be an air station in 1965, when its flying boats were replaced by Lockheed P-2 Neptunes operating from the Kindley Air Force Base (as the former US Army airfield had become). Those US air bases were in fact only two of several US military facilities that operated in Bermuda during the 20th century. The US abandoned many of the bases in 1949, and the remaining few were closed in 1995.

The US accepted the "generous action... to enhance the national security of the United States" and immediately transferred in return 50 Caldwell, Wickes, and Clemson-class U.S. Navy destroyers, "generally referred to as the twelve hundred-ton type" (also known as "flush-deckers", or "four-pipers" after their four funnels). Forty-three ships initially went to the British Royal Navy and seven to the Royal Canadian Navy. In the Commonwealth navies, the ships were renamed after towns and so were known as the "Town" class, but they had originally belonged to three classes (Caldwell, Wickes, and Clemson). Before the end of the war, nine others had also served with the Royal Canadian Navy. Five Towns were manned by Royal Norwegian Navy crews, with the survivors later returned to the Royal Navy.  was manned by Royal Netherlands Navy sailors before her assignment to the St. Nazaire Raid. Nine other destroyers were eventually transferred to the Soviet Navy. Six of the 50 destroyers were lost to U-boats, and three others, including Campbeltown, were destroyed in other circumstances.

Britain had no choice but to accept the deal, but it was so much more advantageous to America than Britain that Churchill's aide John Colville compared it to the USSR's relationship with Finland. The destroyers were in reserve from the massive US shipbuilding program during World War I, and many of the vessels required extensive overhaul because they had not been preserved properly while inactivated. One British admiral called them the "worst destroyers I had ever seen", and only 30 were in service by May 1941. Churchill also disliked the deal, but his advisers persuaded him merely to tell Roosevelt: 

Roosevelt responded by transferring ten Lake-class Coast Guard cutters to the Royal Navy in 1941. The United States Coast Guard vessels were ten years newer than the destroyers and had greater range, which made them more useful as anti-submarine convoy escorts.

The agreement was much more important for being the start of the wartime Anglo-American partnership. Churchill said in the British Parliament that "these two great organisations of the English-speaking democracies, the British Empire and the United States, will have to be somewhat mixed up together in some of their affairs for mutual and general advantage".

Bases

Northern America 

Bermuda

 Not actually part of the exchange, but the US received base rights here for free, in addition to those that were part of the exchange. The US Naval Operating Base was established in 1940, operating as a flying boat base until 1965 (when the US Navy switched to using landplanes from Kindley Air Force Base). The base continued in use for other purposes as the US Naval Annex until 1995. Construction began at the same time of a US Army Air Force airfield, Kindley Field, which was attached to Fort Bell and later became Kindley AFB. Transferred to the US Navy in 1970, it operated as NAS Bermuda until it closed in 1995.

 Newfoundland
 Several Army Air Force airfields. As with Bermuda, no destroyers or other war material was received in exchange for base rights in Newfoundland.
 Pepperrell Airfield (later AFB) (closed August 1961)
 Goose Bay Army Airfield (later AFB) (turned over to Canadian Forces, July 1976)
 Stephenville Army Airfield (later AFB) (closed December 1966)
 McAndrew Army Airfield (McAndrew Air Force Base in 1948; transferred to US Navy, 1955; closed 1994 and eventually transferred to the government of Newfoundland and Labrador for civilian use)
 A Naval Air Station
 Naval Station Argentia (closed 1994)
 Multiple Marine and Army Bases and detachments in support of the above.

British West Indies
 Antigua 
 A Naval Air Station Crabbs at Crabbs Peninsula 
 An Army Air Force airfield (Coolidge Army Airfield (later AFB)) (closed 1949)

 The Bahamas
 Naval seaplane base on Exuma Island at George Town.
 British Guiana
 An Army Air Force airfield (Atkinson Aerodrome (later AFB)) (closed 1949)
 A Naval seaplane base near Suddie, NAF British Guiana

 Barbados
 NAVFAC Harrison's Point, Saint Lucy (closed 1979)

 Jamaica
 An Army Air Force airfield (Vernam Army Airfield (later AFB)) (closed 1949)
 A Naval Air Station (Little Goat Island) and a Naval facility at Port Royal

 Saint Lucia
 An Army Air Force airfield (Beane Army Airfield (later AFB)) (closed 1949)
 A Naval Air Station (Gros Islet Bay) NAF St. Lucia

 Trinidad
 Naval Base Trinidad, Major base 1941 to 1977
 Two Army Air Force airfields
 Waller Army Airfield (later AFB) (closed 1949)
 Carlsen Army Airfield (later AFB) (closed 1949)
 An emergency airstrip (Camden Airstrip)
 A Naval Operating Base, a Naval Air Station, blimp base, and a radio station

Ships
A total of 50 ships were reassigned: 3 Caldwell-class, 27 Wickes-class and 20 Clemson-class destroyers.

See also 

 Banff-class sloops similarly transferred to the Royal Navy in 1941.
 Tizard Mission
 Lend-Lease, a successor agreement loosely modelled on the Destroyers for Bases Agreement.
 Northeast Air Command for airfields in Newfoundland and Labrador

References

Further reading
 Burns, James M. Roosevelt: the Lion and the Fox (1956), 437-52
 Casto, William R.  "Advising Presidents: Robert Jackson and the Destroyers-For-Bases Deal." American Journal of Legal History 52.1 (2012): 1-135. online
 
 Goodhart, Philip. Fifty Ships That Saved The World: The Foundation of the Anglo-American Alliance (London: Heinemann, 1965)
 Leutze, James R. Bargaining For Supremacy: Anglo-American Naval Collaboration, 1937-1941 (1977). online
 Neary, F. F. "Newfoundland and the Anglo‐American Leased Bases Agreement of 27 March 1941." Canadian Historical Review 67#4 (1986): 491-519.
 Pious, Richard M. "The Historical Presidency: Franklin D. Roosevelt and the Destroyer Deal: Normalizing Prerogative Power." Presidential Studies Quarterly 42.1 (2012): 190-204.
 Reynolds,  David. The Creation of the Anglo-American Alliance, 1937-41: A Study in Competitive Co-operation (Univ. of North Carolina Press, 1982), ch. 4 & 5; the standard scholarly history of the entire deal.
 Whitham, Charlie. "The thin end of the wedge: the British Foreign Office, the West Indies and avoiding the Destroyers-Bases Deal, 1938–1940." Journal of Transatlantic Studies 11#3 (2013): 234-248. 
 Woodward, Llewellyn. British Foreign Policy in the Second World War (1962), pp 82–90
 
STRATEGY: Bases Chosen December 1940 Time article about the bases.
 Naval Bases constructed after the deal

External links
 Text of the agreement
 About the bases in Antigua
 Article in the BBC about the agreement

United States Navy in the 20th century
History of the Royal Navy
World War II treaties
United Kingdom–United States treaties
United States–Caribbean relations
Presidency of Franklin D. Roosevelt
Bermuda in World War II
United Kingdom in World War II
United Kingdom–United States military relations
Treaties concluded in 1940
Treaties entered into force in 1940